Red Dot United (abbreviation: RDU) is an opposition political party in Singapore.

History

The party was founded on 26 May 2020 by members of the Progress Singapore Party (PSP) who had resigned from the PSP.

Although the average processing time for a registration application is two months,  received approval on 15 June 2020, three weeks after application, in what appeared to be an expedited process.

 had put forward candidates to contest in the five-seat Jurong Group Representation Constituency for the 2020 Singaporean general election, which was called on 23 June 2020 with the dissolution of the 13th Parliament of Singapore. On 10 July, their only team lost to the PAP team helmed by Senior Minister Tharman Shanmugaratnam in the election's widest winning margin of 74.62%-25.38% share.

Leadership

List of secretaries-general

List of chairpersons

Central Executive Committee

Electoral history

See also 
 Elections in Singapore
 List of political parties in Singapore
 Politics of Singapore

References

External links 
 

Political parties in Singapore
Political parties established in 2020
2020 establishments in Singapore